Transcription elongation factor SPT5 is a protein that in humans is encoded by the SUPT5H gene.

Interactions 

SUPT5H has been shown to interact with:

 CDK9, 
 Cyclin-dependent kinase 7, 
 HTATSF1, 
 PIN1, 
 POLR2A, 
 PRMT1  and
 Protein arginine methyltransferase 5.

Model organisms
Model organisms have been used in the study of SUPT5H function. A conditional knockout mouse line called Supt5tm2a(KOMP)Wtsi was generated at the Wellcome Trust Sanger Institute. Male and female animals underwent a standardized phenotypic screen to determine the effects of deletion. Additional screens performed:  - In-depth immunological phenotyping

References

Further reading